HMS Lightning was a  of the British Royal Navy, later designated an  destroyer, built by Palmers and launched in 1895.

Design and construction

Three torpedo-boat destroyers were ordered on 7 November 1893 from the Jarrow shipbuilders, Palmers Shipbuilding and Iron Company for the Royal Navy as part of the 1893–1894 Naval Estimates.

Displacement was  light and  full load. Three funnels were fitted. Armament consisted of a single QF 12 pounder 12 cwt gun and three 6-pounder guns, with two 18 inch (450 mm) torpedo tubes. One of the torpedo tubes could be removed to accommodate a further two six-pounders, although the Palmer 27-knotters later carried both the two torpedo tubes and all 5 six-pounder guns.

Lightning, together with the other two Palmer-built destroyers, was laid down on 28 March 1894, and was launched on 10 April 1895. Lightning exceeded the required 27 knots, reaching an average of  during sea trials on 5 November 1895. She collided with the collier Belvedere on 8 November when returning to port from these trials, damaging her bows, and then ran aground on the Maplin Sands. Staff Commander Bullmore, in command of the ship during the trials, was found guilty of hazarding the ship by negligence and being drunk when on board Lightning in the resultant court martial. He was severely reprimanded and lost five years seniority. Despite these mishaps Lightning completed in January 1896.

Service
The Palmer-built ships were considered the best of the 27-knotters, and at one stage, both Lightning and Janus were selected for service in distant overseas stations, although in the end, only Janus was sent to the China station, with Lightning serving her whole career in home waters.

Lightning took part in the 1896 British Naval Manoeuvres, attached to the Channel Fleet operation from Berehaven in southern Ireland. She was based at HMNB Portsmouth as a tender to Excellent in 1900. She underwent repairs to re-tube her boilers in 1902, and was commissioned by Lieutenant Rowland Henry Bather on 1 August 1902. She again had her boilers retubed at Sheerness in 1907, after which she returned to Portsmouth. On 17 February 1908 Lightning rammed a mooring buoy in Portsmouth harbour, holing her bow.

In 1910, Lightning was part of the Sixth Destroyer Flotilla, based at The Nore, still being based at the Nore in 1912. On 25 April 1912 Lightning collided with the torpedo boat  in Stangate Creek. Both ships were damaged, and required docking for repair, with Lightnings bow damaged and TB 17 holed below the waterline.

On 30 August 1912 the Admiralty directed all destroyers were to be grouped into classes designated by letters based on contract speed and appearance. After 30 September 1913, as a 27-knotter, Lightning  was assigned to the A class.

Lightning, assigned the pennant number N.23, was allocated to the Nore Local Defence Flotilla by January 1915. On 30 June 1915, following the sighting of floating mines near the Kentish Knock Lightvessel, Lightning and the destroyer  were sent out to deal with the mines. The two ships had destroyed three mines before Lightning struck another mine, lain by the German submarine , killing 15 of her crew. Lightning broke in half, the bow section sinking, while the stern was towed back to Sheerness and later scrapped. The ship's captain was absolved of any blame but was advised that he "might have considered he was in a mine field having already sighted three mines".

References

Notes

Citations

Bibliography
 
 
 
 
 
 
 

 

Janus-class destroyers
1895 ships
Maritime incidents in 1915
Ships sunk by mines
World War I shipwrecks in the North Sea